The Free Church of Antioch is one of several "Malabar Rite" Independent Catholic Churches which claims valid lines of apostolic succession in the historical episcopate which is not in union with the Catholic Pope in Rome or any Orthodox Patriarch. The Free Church of Antioch received several lines of this succession through its founder, the late Archbishop Warren Prall Watters (1890-1992). The Free Church of Antioch was established on October 4, 1992, in Santa Barbara, California, and was incorporated in that state through The Center For Esoteric Studies, of which Archbishop Watters was the Founder and Director.

The church's most important Line of Succession is derived from the Old Catholic Church of Utrecht in the Netherlands. This is important for Independent Catholics, as many hundreds of "wandering bishops" or Episcopi vagantes, derive their succession from this church. Some Roman Catholic scholars hold that the Orders of the Old Catholics are valid but illicit.

Archbishop Herman Adrian Spruit, founder of the Catholic Apostolic Church of Antioch, consecrated Warren P. Watters to the Episcopate on April 28, 1973, at the Trinity Episcopal Church in Santa Barbara, California.

Assisting Archbishop Spruit as co-consecrators were The Most Reverend Stephan A. Hoeller of the Ecclesia Gnostica, and The Most Reverend Jay D. Kirby.
In 1986 Warren Watters was elevated to Archbishop and become Director of Esoteric Studies for the Catholic Apostolic Church of Antioch. He edited and compiled three magazines which culminated in The Esoteric Review. He founded The Center for Esoteric Studies, Inc., a California religious non-profit corporation.

Watters, along with Bishops Robert Branch and Torkom Saraydarian, eventually separated from Herman Spruit, believing that they needed a freer confederation to operate their own ministries. These separations came as a result of certain actions resulting from the reorganization of the mother church, the Catholic Apostolic Church of Antioch. 

Shortly before his death at the age of 102, Watters founded the Free Church of Antioch.

One of his great concerns and motivations in founding the Free Church of Antioch was to re-establish what he believed was a needed balance of female and male in spiritual service. This concern was reflected in his ordination of many women as priests, and in the consecration of many women as bishops.

Upon his death in 1992, Watters was succeeded by his wife, Archbishop Ellen Watters.

Upon her death at the age of 95 on January 12, 2002, the members of the Board of Directors of the Center For Esoteric Studies, Inc., and The Free Church of Antioch passed all legalities and responsibilities of The Center For Esoteric Studies, Inc., and The Free Church of Antioch to Bishop Michelina T. Foster, Director of the Desert Light Chapel in Las Vegas, Nevada. Bishop Michelina T. Foster was consecrated to the episcopate of the Free Church of Antioch by Archbishop Warren Prall Watters and Bishop Ellen Watters.

Bibliography
Bishops At Large by Peter F. Anson, 2006 reprint, Apocryphile Press.
The Wandering Bishops: Apostles of A New Spirituality by Lewis Keizer. 2000 edition.
Independent Bishops: An International Directory, edited by Gary L. Ward, Bertil Persson, and Alan Bain. Apogee Books, 1990.
The Old Catholic Movement: Its Origins and History by C.B. Moss, Apocryphile Press 2005 edition.
The Many Paths of the Independent Sacramental Movement by Fr. John Plummer, Apocryphile Press, 2006.
Episcopi Vagantes and the Anglican Church by Henry R.T. Brandreth, 2006 reprint, Apocryphile Press.

External links
The Free Church of Antioch

Independent Catholic denominations
Christian organizations established in 1992
Presbyterian denominations established in the 20th century